For the Welsh cyclist see Luc Jones

Luc Jones (born 12 May 1994) is a Welsh rugby union player who has recently played for Jersey Reds in the RFU Championship as a scrum half.  Prior to that he played one season for Harlequins, Richmond and three for the Dragons regional team, having previously started his career at Neath RFC. In January 2014 he was named in the Wales under-20 squad for the 2014 Under-20 Six Nations Championship and World Cup.

Personal
His father is former Wales international flanker and Russian Head Coach Lyn Jones.

References

External links 
Newport Gwent Dragons profile

Rugby union players from Neath
Welsh rugby union players
Dragons RFC players
Neath RFC
Living people
1994 births
Rugby union scrum-halves